Erotik (English: Eroticism) is the second full-length album by Swedish black metal band Lifelover, released on CD in February 2007 by Total Holocaust Records & on vinyl in October 2007 by Eternity Records and Blut & Eisen Productions in limited edition of 500 copies (first 100 are pressed on red wax).

This album sees the band drop some of the more conventional black metal elements from their sound, as well as add more elements of rock music.

Track 12 contains the song "M/S Salmonella", from the band's previous album, Pulver, played in reverse.

Track listing

Personnel
 - vocals, speech, guitar
 B - vocals, guitars, bass, piano, lyrics
 H. - guitar
 1853 - additional vocals, speech, lyrics
 LR - vocals (on track 4 & 7), lyrics

2007 albums
Lifelover albums